Bowling, known in Japan as  (part of the Simple 1500 series), is a sports video game developed by Tamsoft and published by D3 Publisher in 1999, and by Agetec in 2001, both for the PlayStation.

Reception

The game received mixed reviews according to the review aggregation website GameRankings. In Japan, Famitsu gave it a score of 21 out of 40.

References

External links
 

1999 video games
Agetec games
Bowling video games
D3 Publisher games
Multiplayer and single-player video games
PlayStation (console) games
PlayStation (console)-only games
Tamsoft video games
Video games developed in Japan